Gauri is a village in Siwan district of Bihar, India. In 2011, it had a population of 5,897.

References

External links

Villages in Siwan district